Paraethria triseriata is a moth of the subfamily Arctiinae. It was described by Gottlieb August Wilhelm Herrich-Schäffer in 1855. It is found in the Brazilian states of Paraná and Santa Catarina.

References

Arctiinae
Moths described in 1855